= Westend Parade =

Village in Gloucester

Coordinates: 51.87073047259477°N 2.2578713034799365°W

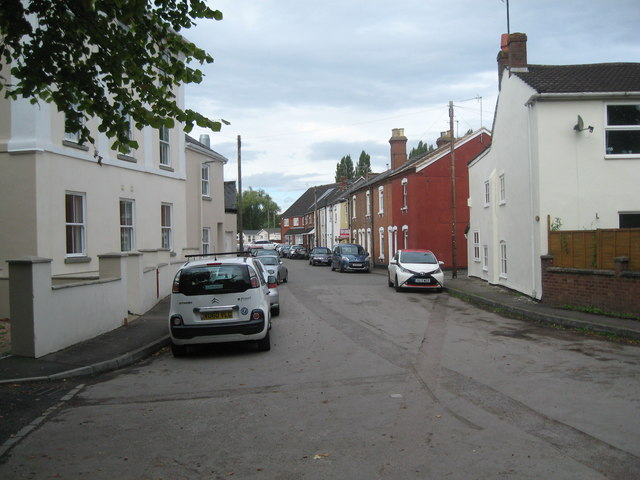
Westend Parade

Westend Parade is an area of Gloucester, England. It is part of the Gloucester parish.
